This is a list of sportspeople from Spartak Voluntary Sports Society. Most of them are World Champions or Olympic medalists.

Artistic gymnastics
Athletes, who competed in artistic gymnastics:
Yelena Davydova
Nellie Kim

Athletics
Athletes, who competed in athletics:
Pyotr Bolotnikov
Sergey Budalov
Nadezhda Chizhova
Lyudmila Dzhigalova
Vladimir Golubnichy
Natalya Lisovskaya
Faina Melnik
Antanas Mikenas
Mariya Pinigina
Sergey Senyukov

Basketball
Basketball players:
Soviet era:
Aleksandr Belov
Post-Soviet:
Andrei Kirilenko

Biathlon
Athletes, who competed in biathlon:
Anatoly Alyabyev

Boxing
Athletes, who competed in boxing:
Boris Lagutin
Lev Mukhin

Chess
Athletes, who competed in chess:
Ashot Nadanian
Tigran Petrosian

Cross-country skiing
Athletes, who competed in cross-country skiing:
Maria Gusakova
Svetlana Nageykina
Yuri Skobov
Nikolay Zimyatov
Rudolf Alexandrov

Figure skating
Athletes, who competed in figure skating:
Marina Klimova
Viktor Petrenko
Sergei Ponomarenko
Lyudmila Smirnova
Andrei Suraikin

Football
Athletes, who competed in football:
Igor Netto
Nikolai Starostin

Handball
Tetyana Hlushchenko (handball)

Ice hockey
Athletes, who competed in ice hockey:
Alexander Yakushev

Mountaineering
Athletes, who competed in mountaineering:
Vitaly Abalakov

Speed skating
Athletes, who competed in speed skating:
Klara Guseva
Igor Zhelezovski

Tennis
Athletes, who competed in tennis:
Nadezhda Belonenko
Elena Dementieva